Sobaeksu Sports Club (Sobaeksu Ch'eyuktang) is a North Korean multi-sports club based in Pyongyang, best known for its men's and women's football teams playing at Yanggakdo Stadium. Sobaeksu is the first tributary of the Amnok river.

History

Rivalries 
Sharing the Yanggakdo Stadium with them, Sobaeksu has a rivalry with Kigwancha.

Players

Current squad

Notable players 
Sobaeksu player Kim Su-hyŏng was listed third on North Korea's list of top ten athletes of 2016, and forward Cho Kwang led all players in scoring in the 2017 edition of the Paektusan Prize football competition, with a total of seven goals.

Sobaeksu has several players with experience in foreign leagues, notably goalkeeper Ri Kwang-il, who played for FK Radnički 1923 and FK Erdoglija Kragujevac in Serbia, and striker Ri Myong-jun, who played with Dinaburg FC and FC Daugava in Latvia, FC Vestsjælland in Denmark, and Singhtarua FC in Thailand. Ri Jun-il is one of several Sobaeksu players who play or have played for the North Korea national football team.

Managers
 Kim Jong-hun (2011–)

Achievements

Domestic Cups
 Paektusan Prize: 1
 Runners-up: 2016
 Poch'ŏnbo Torch Prize: 1
 Runners-up: 2016
 Hwaebul Cup: 1
 Champions: 2017'''

Other sports
In addition to football, they play basketball, volleyball, and ice hockey.

References

External links
North Korea 2007 FIFA U-20 World Cup squad

Football clubs in North Korea
Multi-sport clubs in North Korea
Football clubs in Pyongyang
Military association football clubs in North Korea